The chiterra sarda (Sardinian for "Sardinian guitar") or chitarra sarda in Italian, is a large-bodied baritone guitar from Sardinia used primarily to accompany singers in the cantu a chiterra genre. The body is larger than a dreadnought guitar with a scale length of about 680mm. In Italian, it also goes by the names chitarrone and chitarra gigante, both referring to its large size.

Tuning
It is usually tuned a fourth lower than a standard guitar: B (Si) E (Mi) A (La) D (Re) F# (Fa#) B (Si).

Notable players
Paolo Angeli

References 

Italian musical instruments
Sardinian musical instruments
Guitars
Acoustic guitars